Suspended Animation is the twelfth studio album by Esham. It was released on August 3, 2010 on Reel Life Productions. On December 7, Esham released a follow-up EP, Subatomic Jetpack. It was not an extended version of the album, but a standalone disc containing 32 additional tracks from the recording sessions.

Track listing

Personnel

Musicians 
 Esham A. Smith - performer, executive producer
 Daniel Jordan - performer
 King Solomon - performer
 Ruin Your Life - live instrumentation, production
 Tony Raines
 Ryan C.
 Skeels
 Tony Butchart

Other personnel 
 Deadboy (Anubis Wisdom) - spiritual guidance
 Eric Morgeson - mastering
 Todd Pearl - cover artwork
 Phil Feist - venture capital investor
 Filthy Rockwell - production
 Essman - production
 Pitchbull - production
 Kuttmah - production
 Villain Accelerate - production

References

2010 albums
Albums produced by Esham
Esham albums
Reel Life Productions albums